General elections were held in Saint Kitts-Nevis-Anguilla on 16 November 1961. The result was a victory for the Saint Kitts-Nevis-Anguilla Labour Party, which won seven of the ten elected seats.

Background
A new constitution came into force on 1 January 1960, providing for a 13-member Legislative Council with ten elected members, two nominated members and one ex officio member, the Crown Law Officer.

Results

References

Saint Kitts
Elections in Saint Kitts and Nevis
1961 in Saint Kitts-Nevis-Anguilla
Elections in Anguilla
November 1961 events in North America
Saint Kitts